KHBM-FM (93.7 FM) is a classic rock formatted radio station licensed to Monticello, Arkansas, United States.  The station is currently owned by Pines Broadcasting.

History
The station was assigned the call letters KHBM on August 14, 1978.  On January 31, 1979, the station changed its call sign to the current KHBM. On April 27, 2007, the station was sold to Pines Broadcasting.

Programming 
The station's day-to-day programming mostly consists of a 24-hour Classic Rock Format. Locally the station has "The Morning Show", weekdays from 6-9 A.M.

References

External links

HBM-FM
Classic rock radio stations in the United States
Radio stations established in 1978